The Harley-Davidson Milwaukee-Eight engine is the ninth generation of "big twin" engines developed by the company, but only Harley's third all-new Big Twin in 80 years, first introduced in 2016. These engines differ from the traditional Harley Big Twin engines in that there are four valves per cylinder, totaling eight valves, hence the name. It also marked a return to the single-camshaft configuration as used on previous Harley Big Twin Engines from 1936 to 1999. In addition, the engines all have internal counterbalancers, whereas Twin Cams were counterbalanced only on Softail models, where the engine was rigidly mounted.

107 and 114 and 117 engines
All engines have eight valves in two cylinders in the traditional V-twin configuration at 45°, are combination of air-cooled and oil-cooled, and activate valves with push-rods.

Differences from the predecessor (Twin Cam)
In 2016, the Milwaukee-Eight engines became available on Touring and Trike models of the 2017 model year. The Softail models started using the Milwaukee-Eight the following year. The most significant change from the Twin Cam are the two extra valves per cylinder head which produce 10 percent more torque. The exhaust and intake flow capacity is increased by 50 percent over the Twin Cam models. Although weighing the same as its predecessor, both models of the Milwaukee-Eight increase in acceleration by 10% (0-60 for the 107 vs the 103) and 8% (0-60 for the 114 vs. the 110). Fuel economy is also increased, with percentages varying for engine and model.

Improvements 
Harley conducted interviews in seven cities; over 1,000 people were asked to outline what they would like to see in the next line of touring bikes. These interviews resulted in the new Milwaukee-Eight engine. The biggest improvements people wanted to see were more power, less heat, and less vibration. Harley was able to increase the power while also keeping the range and consumption similar and in some cases making it even better. To deal with the heat issue, Harley reduced the exhaust gas temperature by 100°F (55.6 C), allowing for a more comfortable ride. They were able to make this possible by relocating the hot catalytic converters further from the cockpit, as well as introducing a better water cooling solution. Finally, Harley looked at the vibration issues and decided to reduce the vibrations by 75%, in order to affect a balance between hardcore fans and new Harley owners.

Reception 
Cycle World, like many other motorcycle magazines, was given the opportunity to test ride and review the Milwaukee-Eight engine. The reviews have been positive, and report a better ride quality, while still keeping the Harley feel. Cycle World's reviewer reported a noticeable reduction in the heat output from the engine, enabling the reviewer to ride more comfortably. The review concludes that the changes make this engine an improvement over its predecessor.

References

Harley-Davidson engines